Osiris Jahkail Williams (born September 7, 1998), known professionally as YK Osiris, is an American rapper and singer from Jacksonville, Florida. He initially gained popularity with the release of his songs "I'm Next (Freestyle)" and "Valentine". In 2022, he was dropped from Def Jam Recordings.

Life and career 
Williams was born in Jacksonville, Florida. He started making music of his own at a young age. Williams first uploaded songs under his given name, posting his song "Fake Love" in 2017 before using the moniker "YK Osiris" (YK stands for Young King) for future productions.

Discography

Studio albums

Singles

Other charted songs

References 

1998 births
Living people
African-American male rappers
American hip hop singers
American male rappers
Musicians from Jacksonville, Florida
American contemporary R&B singers
Rappers from Florida
Pop rappers
21st-century African-American people